Dimokratias Square (Plateia Dimokratias, "Democracy Square") is the central square of the city of Agrinio.

The square was created in 1879 when Michail Bellos (Μιχαήλ Μπέλλος) was mayor, and was long named Bellou Square (Πλατεία Μπέλλου) after him. On Good Friday 1944, the German occupation authorities hung Avraam Anastasiadis, Panos Soulos and Christos Salakos from the square's lamp-posts. Today, three roads leading to the square are named after them.

References

The first version of the article is translated from the article at the Greek Wikipedia (Main page)

Agrinio
Buildings and structures in Aetolia-Acarnania
Squares in Greece